Sydney-Pyrmont, an electoral district of the Legislative Assembly in the Australian state of New South Wales, was created in 1894 and abolished in 1904.


Election results

Elections in the 1900s

1902 by-election

1901

Elections in the 1890s

1898

1895

1894

Notes

References 

New South Wales state electoral results by district